Alfred George Barratt (13 April 1920 – 2002) was an English professional footballer who played as a defender.

References

1921 births
2002 deaths
Sportspeople from Kettering
English footballers
Association football defenders
Weldon F.C. players
Kettering Town F.C. players
Northampton Town F.C. players
Stewart & Lloyds F.C. players
Leicester City F.C. players
Grimsby Town F.C. players
Southport F.C. players
English Football League players